Trinity Theological College, Umuahia is a religious training college affiliated to the University of Nigeria.

References

External links
 Facebook

Universities and colleges in Nigeria
Education in Abia State
Educational institutions established in 1948
1948 establishments in Nigeria